Nesbitt is a surname. Notable people with the surname include:
Ángel Nesbitt, baseball player
Aric Nesbitt (born 1980), American politician
Arthur James Nesbitt, Canadian stock broker, investor 
Arthur Deane Nesbitt, decorated Canadian soldier, stock broker
Cathleen Nesbitt, British actress
Cecil J. Nesbitt, North American mathematician and actuary
Charles R. Nesbitt, Oklahoma politician
Charles H. Nesbitt, New York politician
Christine Nesbitt, Canadian speed skater
David Nesbitt, Bahamian basketball player
Derren Nesbitt, English actor
Esta Nesbitt, (1918–1975) American fashion illustrator and xerox artist
George Nesbitt, Australian politician
George Nesbitt (Irish politician), Irish businessman and politician
J. Aird Nesbitt, Canadian department store owner
James Nesbitt, Northern Irish actor
Jennifer Nesbitt, British long-distance runner
John Nesbitt (disambiguation), multiple people
Joshua Nesbitt (born 1988), American football player
Kenn Nesbitt, American children's poet
Lowell Blair Nesbitt, American artist
Máiréad Nesbitt, Irish fiddler and violin player
Martin Nesbitt (born 1962), American businessman
Martin Nesbitt (politician) (1946–2014), American politician
Mary Cordell Nesbitt, American politician
Nina Nesbitt, Scottish singer
Randolph Nesbitt, South African soldier and Victoria Cross recipient
Robert Nesbitt (disambiguation), multiple people
Stacey Nesbitt, professional motorcycle road racer
Sterling Nesbitt, American paleontologist
Travis Nesbitt, Canadian vocalist
Wallace Nesbitt, Canadian jurist

See also
Clan Nesbitt, a Scottish clan
Nesbit (disambiguation)